The National Football League (NFL) has played numerous games outside the United States. All of the league's current and former teams have been based in the contiguous United States, with only the Pro Bowl played in a non-contiguous U.S. state (Hawaii).

Canadian Football League interleague games
Six games held in Canada between 1950 and 1961 pitted NFL teams against Canadian Football League (CFL) (or precursor) teams. These games were a hybrid of American and Canadian football. Ottawa hosted the first two games, while Toronto hosted three of the remaining four and Montreal held one; the first game ever held in Toronto featuring an NFL team was in August 1959 and inaugurated the city's Exhibition Stadium. One game was played between the AFL's Buffalo Bills and CFL's Hamilton Tiger-Cats in August 1961, with Hamilton winning 38–21. There was also a game in 1960 that pitted the Chicago Bears against the New York Giants played in Toronto; this was in return for a 1958 CFL matchup that was played in Philadelphia.

The Western Interprovincial Football Union (later the Western Conference of the CFL) was never involved in interleague play with the NFL, although its teams occasionally played members of other rival U.S. leagues in the circuit's early years. At the time, the Western teams were still struggling to gain recognition within Canada as the Eastern Conference's competitive equal. A more practical factor inhibiting Western interleague play with the NFL was the prohibitive amount of time it would have taken to travel by rail from an NFL city to Western Canada for an exhibition game (the CFL did not even implement regular season interconference play until air travel came to be seen as a safe means of transport in the 1960s). Also, by the 1950s the West was already playing its regular season in August while the Eastern Conference still started its season around the same time as the NFL.

Global Cup
In the summer of 1983 an English entrepreneur named John Marshall hired Wembley Stadium and brought the Minnesota Vikings and St. Louis Cardinals over to play a pre-season exhibition game called The Global Cup. Just over 30,000 fans turned out that day to witness the game.  In 1984, Marshall invited the United States Football League's Tampa Bay Bandits and Philadelphia Stars to play a post season exhibition game in July.

American Bowl

The American Bowl was a series of NFL pre-season exhibition games that were held at sites outside the United States between 1986 and 2005.  The league started the American Bowl series in 1986 primarily to promote American football in other countries.  The American Bowl was a fifth pre-season game, played the same weekend as the Pro Football Hall of Fame Game, and did not take away a game from the participating teams' pre-season schedules.  At least one American Bowl game was played annually from 1986 to 2003. As many as four were played per year in the early 1990s. There was no American Bowl game played in 2004.  The last American Bowl was held in 2005. NFL Commissioner Roger Goodell cited the league's new international strategy in the abandonment of international pre-season games as well as the closure of NFL Europe, instead focusing on playing regular season games in foreign countries.  There have been three international pre-season games during the American Bowl era that did not receive the American Bowl name because they were not arranged by the NFL but, rather, the scheduled home team elected to play there.

China Bowl

The China Bowl was the name of a proposed  NFL pre-season exhibition game that had been scheduled to take place in August 2007, but later postponed to August 2009 so that more focus could be placed on the start of the International Series, and ultimately canceled, between the New England Patriots and the Seattle Seahawks at the National Stadium in Beijing.  The originally scheduled China Bowl was to be played at Workers Stadium in Beijing, China, on August 8, 2007. The game was to kick off the one-year countdown before the 2008 Summer Olympics in Beijing, and would have been the first NFL-sanctioned game to take place in China.

In March 2019, NFL was reportedly discuss at owners meetings whether it will play a game in China in 2020 season. San Francisco 49ers and Los Angeles Rams were among the teams interested due to situating West Coast for less travel. It would take place prior to the start of the regular season for the rest of the league in order to make up for the intense travel and time difference. Suitable venue and air quality were other concerns.

Fútbol Americano

On October 2, 2005, the Arizona Cardinals defeated the San Francisco 49ers by a score of 31–14 at Estadio Azteca in Mexico City, under the name NFL Fútbol Americano. It was the first regular season NFL game held outside the United States. The game drew the NFL's highest game attendance at the time with 103,467 spectators.

NFL International Series

Beginning with the 2007 season, the National Football League has hosted regular season American football games outside the United States every year in a series known as the International Series. Wembley Stadium, in London, United Kingdom, was the first location to host the series, staging at least one game every year since the series began.

In October 2015 the league announced that a resolution had been passed approving continuing the International Series until 2025, and expanding it to include games in international cities outside the United Kingdom.  The NFL has an agreement to play at least two games per year at Wembley until 2020, with the Jacksonville Jaguars relocating a home game there annually throughout the agreement.  In addition, three to five games are scheduled to take place at England rugby's Twickenham Stadium between 2016 and 2018, while at least two games per year are planned to be played at the new stadium at Northumberland Development Project between 2018 and 2027 as part of an agreement with Tottenham Hotspur.

Additional markets under consideration included Mexico, Germany and Canada.  On February 5, 2016, it was announced that the Oakland Raiders would host the Houston Texans on November 21, 2016, at Estadio Azteca in Mexico City, Mexico. On November 19, 2017, the Estadio Azteca hosted a regular season Sunday afternoon game between the New England Patriots and the Oakland Raiders. On November 19, 2018, the Los Angeles Rams were the designated home team against the Kansas City Chiefs in Mexico, however the field conditions at Estadio Azteca did not meet NFL regulations so the game was moved to Los Angeles.

Bills Toronto Series

The Bills Toronto Series was an agreement between the Buffalo Bills and Rogers Communications to host a series of Bills National Football League games at the Rogers Centre in nearby Toronto, Ontario, Canada in an attempt by the team to broaden its fan base.  The Bills Toronto Series was distinct from the NFL International Series because it is arranged by an individual team rather than the league.

The series was conceived by a group that included then Bills owner Ralph Wilson, Ted Rogers of Rogers Communications and Larry Tanenbaum of Maple Leaf Sports & Entertainment.  During the original five-year deal, which began with the 2008 season, the Bills played one regular season home game per year as well as a pre-season home game at Rogers Centre in 2008 and 2010, for a total of seven games in Toronto.  A pre-season game originally planned for 2012 was cancelled, as home games for the Toronto Blue Jays and Toronto Argonauts and a Bruce Springsteen concert conflicted with the NFL pre-season.  In 2013, the series was renewed for five more years through 2017.  The new deal featured one regular season game each year plus a pre-season game in 2015. However, following the first contest in 2013 it was announced that Rogers and the Bills had postponed the series for a year, and several months later, following the sale of the Bills to new ownership, the parties reached an agreement to cancel the Toronto Series permanently.

Impact on teams
Teams that have had the scheduling disadvantage of giving up a home game to participate in the series, resulting in seven home games, eight away games and one neutral site game, have seen a significant disparity in their success relative to the designated visitors, who end up with eight home games, seven away games and one neutral site game. For the 18 regular season games played outside the United States through 2015, 20 of the 21 designated home teams failed to reach the playoffs while 11 of the 21 designated visitors reached the postseason that year. In 2015, the Kansas City Chiefs became the first designated home team to go on to reach the playoffs. However, many teams accept the tradeoff of an increased opportunity for international marketing.

List of games
Below is a list of games played outside the United States by teams from the NFL, and its precursor leagues the American Football League of 1926 (AFL 1926), All-America Football Conference (AAFC), and American Football League (AFL) from which the NFL absorbed teams.

Legend

AB = American Bowl
CFL = Canadian Football League interleague games
CB = China Bowl
GC = Global Cup
IS = NFL International Series
BTS = Bills Toronto Series
FA = Fútbol Americano
MSB = Mainichi Star Bowl
MC = Molson Challenge
VAFC = Volvo American Football Classic
INT = Interleague game
EXH = Exhibition game
REG = Regular season game

Number of games by city

Notes

See also
List of college football games played outside the United States

References

Games played outside the United States
American football in Toronto
American football in Mexico
American football in Australia
American football in Japan
American football in China
American football in London
American football in Spain
American football in Sweden